This article is a list of diseases of tomatoes (Solanum lycopersicum).

Bacterial diseases

Fungal diseases

Lepidoptera larvae

Nematodes

Viral and viroid

Miscellaneous diseases and disorders

References

Common Names of Diseases, The American Phytopathological Society
Tomato Diagnostic Key, The Cornell Plant Pathology Vegetable Disease Web Page
Tomato Diseases (Fact Sheets and Information Bulletins), The Cornell Plant Pathology Vegetable Disease Web Page
 Gautam, P. 2008. Bacterial Speck Disease of Tomato: An Insight into Host-Bacteria Interaction. GRIN Publishing 

Tomato
Tomato diseases